Giant-Size X-Men #1 was a special issue of the X-Men comic book series, published by Marvel Comics in 1975. It was written by Len Wein and illustrated by Dave Cockrum. Though not a regular issue, it contained the first new X-Men story in five years, titled Second Genesis. The issue serves as a link between the original X-Men and a new team. Chronologically it is placed after X-Men #66 and before X-Men #94. The 68-page book was published with a May 1975 cover date and distributed to newsstands in February of that year.

Publication history 
The X-Men title stopped producing new stories after #66 in March 1970. From December 1970 through April 1975, Marvel reprinted many of the older X-Men issues as #67–93. Following the May publication of Giant-Size X-Men #1, Marvel began again publishing new issues of X-Men with #94 in August 1975.

The comic also collects reprints from X-Men #43, #47 and #57.

Plot 
The story opens in medias res, with Professor X recruiting a new team of X-Men, to rescue the original X-Men (Marvel Girl, Iceman and Angel [but not Beast, who had left the team], plus X-Men recruits Havok and Polaris), who had disappeared on a mission to the island of Krakoa, with only their leader Cyclops escaping.  The new team consists of Sunfire and Banshee, who had been introduced in earlier X-Men comics; Wolverine, who had made his first appearance in The Incredible Hulk #181 (Oct. 1974); and the newly created Storm, Nightcrawler, Colossus, and Thunderbird. These members are gathered from all over the world, and Professor X uses his telepathic powers to teach them all English so that they can communicate with each other.

The team soon learns that Krakoa is not just an island, but a giant mutant as well. Despite personality clashes among the individual members, as well as a fatality, the new team succeeds in rescuing the old X-Men and destroying the entity by shooting it into outer space with Polaris' power. The issue ends by posing the question of the future of a 13-member X-Men team.

The later storyline "Deadly Genesis" offers a ret-con of this story, which tells how Professor X had initially recruited a different team before the events in this issue.

Credits
Story, edits — Len Wein
Pencils, cover inks — Dave Cockrum
Cover pencils — Gil Kane
Inks — Dave Cockrum & Peter Iro
Letters — John Costanza
Colors — Glynis Wein

Reprint 
The "Second Genesis" story was reprinted in Classic X-Men #1 in September 1986, with substantial editing to reduce its length, and a new backup story by Claremont and John Bolton bridging the gap between this and the following issue, Uncanny X-Men #94.

Collected editions

Marvel Masterworks

Epic Collections

Essentials

Panini Pocket Books

Second issue
Marvel published a second issue of Giant-Size X-Men later in 1975. This November issue had no new material, instead featuring reprints of stories from X-Men #57, #58, and #59, written by Roy Thomas and illustrated by Neal Adams.

Third and fourth issues
In 2005, Marvel published two new Giant Size X-Men issues to celebrate the 30th anniversary of the original. Issue #3 in July contained a story written by Joss Whedon and illustrated by Neal Adams. The issue also reprinted several older X-Men team-ups: the group's appearance in Fantastic Four #28, an Avengers guest appearance in X-Men #9 and a story featuring Spider-Man in X-Men #35. In November, Chris Claremont penned a story for issue #4, with artwork by Neal Adams. It also reprinted material related to the death of Thunderbird from X-Men #94-95, Classic X-Men #3 and Uncanny X-Men #193.

40th Anniversary edition hardcover 
The series has also been collected into a hardcover paperback titled Giant-Size X-Men: 40th Anniversary Edition. The hardcover collects Giant-Size X-Men #1, 3-4; Classic X-Men #1; X-Men Origins: Colossus; X-Men Origins: Wolverine; X-Men: Deadly Genesis #1-6; What If? (1989) #9, #23; and material from X-Men Gold #1. The second Giant-Sized issue was likely omitted, due to it being reprints of X-Men #57-59. The 440-page paperback was released June 2015. )

Dawn of X
Five Giant Size X-Men one-shots, all written by Jonathan Hickman, were released as part of Marvel's 2019 Dawn of X relaunch of its X-Men books between February and September 2020. The first, Giant Size X-Men: Jean Grey and Emma Frost, was drawn by Russell Dauterman and colored by Matt Wilson. The second, Giant-Size X-Men: Nightcrawler, was drawn by Alan Davis and colored by Carlos Lopez. The third, Giant-Size X-Men: Magneto, was drawn by Ramon Perez and colored by David Curiel. The fourth, Giant-Size X-Men: Fantomex, was drawn and colored by Rod Reis. The fifth, Giant-Size X-Men: Storm, was drawn by Dauterman and colored by Wilson.

Prints

References 

Comics by Len Wein
Defunct American comics
X-Men titles
1975 comics debuts